James Dugan (May 19, 1898 – August 5, 1937), also known as James S. Dugan or Jimmy Dugan was an American film director of the silent and early sound film eras. While mostly used as an assistant or second unit director, he had the opportunity to helm a few silent films. Dugan's career was cut short when he died in 1937 due to heart disease.

Life and career
Born on May 19, 1898, in Los Angeles, California, Dugan would enter the film industry at the age of 23, assisting the prolific director/actor Jerome Storm on the 1921 silent film, Her Social Value. In 1927 he would have his first opportunity to have the top directing slot when he was tagged to direct the western film, The Desert Pirate. Over the next 2 years he would again take the directing reins twice more, but other than that brief foray, the remainder of his career would see him return to either assistant or unit direction roles. In 1935, although he had worked with her on several films, Dugan would remove himself as assistant director on Mae West's film, Klondike Annie, citing differences with the actress.

In the midst a career in which he was continuously working, Dugan would die on August 5, 1937, from heart disease, mere months after the release of the final film he worked on, A Family Affair. He was survived by a wife and two children.

Filmography
(as per AFI's database)

References

1898 births
1937 deaths
American film directors
American male film actors
20th-century American male actors